Ben Stevenson OBE (born 4 April 1936), is a former ballet dancer with Britain's Royal Ballet and English National Ballet, co-director of National Ballet of Washington, D.C. (1971–1974), artistic director of Chicago Ballet (1974-1975), artistic director of Houston Ballet (1976–2003), and current artistic director of Texas Ballet Theater (2003–present).

Early life
A native of Portsmouth, England, Stevenson received his dance training at the Arts Educational School in London. Upon his graduation, he was awarded the prestigious Adeline Genée Gold Medal, the highest award give to a dancer by the Royal Academy of Dancing.

Career
At the age of 18, Stevenson was invited to join the Sadler's Wells Royal Ballet by Dame Ninette de Valois. A few years later, Anton Dolin invited him to dance with the London Festival Ballet, where, as a principal dancer, he performed leading roles in all the classics.

After choreographing Cinderella in 1970 for the National Ballet of Washington, D.C., he joined the company in 1971 as co-director with Frederic Franklin. That same year, he staged a new production of The Sleeping Beauty in observance of the inaugural season of the John F. Kennedy Center for the Performing Arts.

After a brief association with Ruth Page's Chicago Ballet, in 1976, Stevenson was appointed artistic director of the Houston Ballet, which he developed into one of America's leading ballet companies. During his tenure, he expanded the company's repertory by acquiring the works of the world's most respected choreographers, commissioning new works, staging the classics and choreographing original works.

During this time as artistic director of America's fifth-biggest ballet company, and when Barbara Bush was a trustee of the company, in 1978 Stevenson visited Beijing and offered the Chinese dancer, Li Cunxin a six-week scholarship to America and later on his defection, offered him a position with the company. Cunxin returned where he danced at the gala at Stevenson's retirement after 27 years with the Houston Ballet.

In 2003, he was named Director Emeritus of Houston Ballet and the company's academy was renamed the Ben Stevenson Academy.

In 2004, Stevenson accepted the position of Artistic Director of Texas Ballet Theater in Fort Worth.

Stevenson has received numerous awards for his choreography, including three gold medals at the Varna International Ballet Competitions of 1972, 1982, and 1986. In addition, he has staged his ballets for the Harkness Ballet, English National Ballet, American Ballet Theatre, the Paris Opera Ballet, La Scala in Milan, Rome Opera House, the Munich State Opera Ballet, The Joffrey Ballet, London City Ballet, Ballet de Santiago, The Perm State P. I. Tchaikovsky Opera and Ballet Theatre and for many companies in the United States.

In the Bruce Beresford 2009 film Mao's Last Dancer, Stevenson was portrayed by Canadian actor Bruce Greenwood.

References

1936 births
Living people
English male ballet dancers
English National Ballet dancers
Dancers of The Royal Ballet
English choreographers
Houston Ballet
Officers of the Order of the British Empire